Rei Nuriu (born 16 October 1998) is an Albanian professional footballer who plays as a defender for Albanian club Dinamo Tirana and the Albania national under-21 football team.

Club career

Early career

Dinamo Tirana

International career
Nuriu received his first call up to the Albania national under-19 team by coach Arjan Bellaj for the friendly tournament Roma Caput Mundi from 29 February–4 March 2016.

He received his first call up for the Albania under-20 side by same coach of the under-21 team Alban Bushi for the friendly match against Georgia U20 on 14 November 2017. He debuted for under-20 team against Georgia coming on as a substitute in the 55th minute for Shaqir Tafa in an eventual 3–0 loss.

Career statistics

Club

References

External links
Rei Nuriu profile FSHF.org

1998 births
Living people
Footballers from Tirana
Albanian footballers
Association football defenders
Albania youth international footballers
FK Dinamo Tirana players
KF Tirana players
KF Skënderbeu Korçë players
KS Kastrioti players
Kategoria Superiore players
Kategoria e Parë players